Hayley Amber Hasselhoff (born August 26, 1992) is an American actress and plus-size model. She is known for her role as Amber in the ABC Family original series Huge. She is the daughter of David Hasselhoff and Pamela Bach. Hasselhoff starred in the short-lived 2010 A&E reality series The Hasselhoffs. She also starred in Celebrity Showmance.

Early life
Hasselhoff was born in Los Angeles, California to parents David Hasselhoff and Pamela Bach (née Weissenbach). She has an older sister, Taylor.

Career
Hasselhoff started acting in 1999 when she appeared in her father's TV series Baywatch. She has also starred in the reality television series The Hasselhoffs and in 2010 she played Amber in Huge for 10 episodes.

Hasselhoff has also been modeling as a plus-size model since 2007 when she was 14. She is considered a "plus-size model" as she is a size 14. She has been signed with Wilhelmina Models and as of 2014, is signed with Ford Models. She has walked in shows such as the 2014 British Plus Size Fashion Week, and has modeled for Torrid. She has also been named the ambassador for Pulp Fashion Week in Paris. In October 2019, she began competing in The X Factor: Celebrity. She was eliminated at the audition stage. In April 2021, Hasselhoff became the first plus-size model to pose for the cover of the German edition of Playboy.

Filmography

References

External links 

1992 births
Actresses from Los Angeles
American child actresses
American film actresses
American television actresses
Female models from California
Living people
Plus-size models
21st-century American women